Muehlenbeckia australis, the large-leaved muehlenbeckia or pohuehue, is a prostrate or climbing plant native to New Zealand.

Description
It has juvenile and adult leaf forms and loses its leaves in winter. The flowers are greenish and the fruits are juicy with black shiny seeds covered by a white, succulent cup of sepals, which are fed on by various birds and lizards.
Flowers bloom from late spring to autumn, with it panicles occur usually in spring and summer. Fruits are present from November to April, sometimes till June.

Taxonomy
The species was first described in 1786 by Georg Forster, as Coccoloba australis. It was transferred to the genus Muehlenbeckia in 1841 by Carl Meissner. Some sources, including Plants of the World Online, regard Muehlenbeckia adpressa as a synonym of this species. Others treat them as separate species.

Ecology
M. australis prefers places with plenty of sunlight and climbing support, such as forest edges, cliff faces, scrub and regenerating vegetation. With its climbing and rapid growth form, it is capable of engulfing roadside trees, and has benefited from cleared habitats created since human settlement began, and is sometimes the only native species present in such areas.

Host plant 
M. australis is a host plant for numerous New Zealand endemic insects including Pyrgotis eudorana, Apoctena orthropis, Argosarchus horridus, and Clitarchus hookeri.

References

External links

Citizen science observations of M. australis.
Images

australis
Flora of New Zealand